G. Ward Hubbs is a history professor, archivist, and  author in the United States. He wrote a book on Tuscaloosa's history to commemorate its bicentennial and authored the books Searching for Freedom after the Civil War: Klansman, Carpetbagger, Scalawag, and Freedman and  Voices from Company D: Diaries by the Greensboro Guards, Fifth Alabama Infantry Regiment, Army of Northern Virginia. He has won several literary awards. Hubbs is a professor emeritus at Birmingham-Southern College. He is the editor of a book of humorous and  "rowdy" tales from John Gorman Barr.

He is a protege of George Rable.

Written work
Tuscaloosa: 200 Years in the Making (2019)
Searching for Freedom after the Civil War: Klansman, Carpetbagger, Scalawag, and Freedman
Voices from Company D: Diaries by the Greensboro Guards, Fifth Alabama Infantry Regiment, Army of Northern Virginia, Universitt of Georgia Press
Rowdy Tales from Early Alabama: The Humor of John Gorman Barr, editor

References

Year of birth missing (living people)
Living people
American historians